{{Infobox person
| name               = Matthew O'Callaghan
| image              = 
| alt                = 
| caption            = 
| birth_name         = 
| birth_place        = Chicago, Illinois, US
| birth_date         = 
| alma_mater         = 
| death_place        = 
| other_names        = Matt O'Callaghan
| known_for          = Life with Louie
| occupation         = 
| employer           = 
| notable_works      = Curious GeorgeLooney Tunes short films
| yearsactive        = 1981present
| spouse             = 
| children           = 
}}
Matthew O'Callaghan (born August 31, 1966) is an American film director, animator, writer, and storyboard artist whose credits include directing the 2006 film Curious George and co-creating the television series Life with Louie.

 Life and career 
O'Callaghan was born in 1966 in Chicago, where he was raised. In 1995, he co-created the animated sitcom series Life with Louie which ran from 1995 to 1998.

He worked on various Warner Bros. and Looney Tunes projects such as Coyote Falls, Fur of Flying, I Tawt I Taw a Puddy Tat, Flash in the Pain, Rabid Rider, and Daffy's Rhapsody, in which he served as the director for all three short films, in which the shorts debuted in 2010, focusing on Wile E. Coyote and the Road Runner. For his work on Daffy's Rhapsody, he was nominated at the Annecy International Animation Film Festival in 2012.

Meanwhile, back in 2006, O'Callaghan directed Curious George, a film starring Frank Welker as the titular title character and based on the popular children's books created by Margret and H. A. Rey. He served as one of the storyboard artists on for Space Jam: A New Legacy, a sequel to the 1996 film Space Jam which starred Michael Jordan. Meanwhile back in 1987, he, along with Darrell Van Citters, directed the Disney television special Sport Goofy in Soccermania. 

He directed and produced Open Season's sequel Open Season 2. He served as the creative talent of Mickey's Christmas Carol, which marked the return of Mickey Mouse after the 1953 short, The Simple Things. He was an additional animator in the 1988 film Who Framed Roger Rabbit. In 1989, he served as the storyboard artist and directing animator for Disney's The Little Mermaid. He created the 1993 animated series titled for The Itsy Bitsy Spider, a television series sequel to the film for Itsy Bitsy Spider, directed by O'Callaghan.

Filmography

 Film and television 

Awards and nominations

 Annecy International Animated Film Festival (2012) - Nominated for Daffy's Rhapsody (2012)
 Chicago International Film Festival (1992) - Nominated for Best Short Film on Itsy Bitsy Spider (1992)
 Daytime Emmy Awards (1999) - Nominated for Outstanding Special Class Animated Program for Life with Louie (1995)
 DVD Exclusive Awards (2005) - Nominated for Best Screenplay (for a DVD Premiere Movie) on  Mickey's Twice Upon a Christmas (2004)
 Edgar Allan Poe Awards (1987) - Nominated for Best Motion Picture on The Great Mouse Detective (1986)
 Humanitas Prize (1998) - Nominated for Children's Animation Category for Life with Louie'' (1995)

References

External links
 
A Lunchtime Chat With Matt O'Callaghan - Part 1

Living people
Animators from Illinois
American film directors
American screenwriters
Walt Disney Animation Studios people
American storyboard artists
American animated film directors
American voice directors
Animation screenwriters
1966 births